Christmas... From the Realms of Glory is the first holiday album by contemporary Christian musician Bebo Norman. The album is the first with BEC Recordings, and his eighth album overall including his first independent release. This album was released on October 7, 2007, and the producers are Jason Ingram, Bebo Norman and Rusty Varenkamp.

Critical reception

Jesus Freak Hideout's John DiBiase said that "Bebo Norman's warm and intimate voice is a perfect match for the Christmas season. His first official venture singing original and all-time favorites is a triumph and easily among the greatest CCM offerings in the Christmas genre to date. As this particular Christmas looks to bring with it some truly memorable projects, consider Bebo Norman's Christmas... From The Realms Of Glory to mark one of the first grand achievements for 2007."

Track listing

Personnel 
 Bebo Norman – lead and backing vocals acoustic guitar, arrangements (1, 2, 4, 6, 9, 11)
 Jason Ingram – acoustic piano, programming, acoustic guitar, backing vocals, arrangements (1, 2, 4, 6, 9, 11)
 Paul Moak – Wurlitzer electric piano, Hammond B3 organ, pump organ, toy piano, acoustic guitar, electric guitars, pedal steel guitar, banjitar, vibraphone, glockenspiel 
 Gabe Scott – acoustic guitar, pedal steel guitar, banjo, dobro, accordion, hammered dulcimer 
 Matt Pierson – bass
 Ken Lewis – drums, percussion 
 David Henry – cello 
 Chris Carmichael – viola, violin 
 Amy Grant – guest vocals (8)

Production 
 Jason Ingram – producer 
 Bebo Norman – producer 
 Rusty Varenkamp – producer, recording, mixing (5, 12, 13)
 Tom Laune – mixing (1-4, 6-11)
 Dan Shike – mastering 
 Tyson Paoletti – A&R 
 Traci Bishir – production assistant 
 Siesta – artwork, design 
 Anthony Saint James – photography 
 Chad Sylva – set up assistant 

Studios
 Recorded at Emack Studio (Franklin, Tennessee); The Smoakstack (Nashville, Tennessee); Little Hollywood Hills (Brentwood, Tennessee).
 Mastered at Tone and Volume Mastering (Nashville, Tennessee).

Charts

References

2007 Christmas albums
Bebo Norman albums
BEC Recordings albums
Christmas albums by American artists